Mitostoma chrysomelas is an harvestmen species  widely distributed in Central Europe, British Isles, France  and Southeast to Bulgaria.

Harvestmen
Arachnids of Europe
Taxa named by Johann Hermann
Animals described in 1804